Fibroblast growth factor 21 is a liver-secreted peptide hormone that in humans is encoded by the FGF21 gene. Together with FGF19 (FGF15 in rodents) and FGF23, this protein is a member of the endocrine subgroup within the fibroblast growth factor (FGF) family. FGF21 is a potent, extracellularly acting metabolic regulator, whose action was discovered through in vitro phenotypic screening and diet manipulation studies in rodents.,  unlike canonical growth-stimulating FGFs known to stimulate mitosis, differentiation and angiogenesis in their target tissues,  FGF21 exerts its action by activating FGF21 receptors located in the cell membrane of target cells. Each FGF21 receptor is composed of a transmembrane FGF receptor protein (either FGFR1, FGFR2 or FGFR3), and its complexing co-receptor β-Klotho. Loss of β-Klotho abolishes all effects of FGF21 in vitro and in vivo. In addition to its action as a hormone, FGF21 may be able to act in an autocrine fashion (typically in fat cells), or possibly also in a paracrine manner in the pancreas.

Apart from directly regulating energy metabolism in various tissues, FGF21 also regulates simple sugar intake and preferences for sweet foods via signaling through FGF21 receptors in the paraventricular nucleus of the hypothalamus and correlates with reduced dopamine neurotransmission within the nucleus accumbens.  Attempts are under way to develop metabolic medicines using various FGF21 analogs, mimetics or sentitizers of the FGF21 pathway.

Structure 

It is a single-chain protein containing 209 amino acid residues, which is encoded by the mammalian FGF21 gene.

Function 
FGF21 is beneficially involved in the regulation of lipid, glucose, and energy metabolism. It can be synthesized in several organs and tissues, but it is mainly or solely exported into the circulation by the liver, in amounts typically responding to stress or dietary factors such as caloric or protein intake. Depending on the relation between production and target sites, FGF21 can operate in an autocrine, paracrine or endocrine mode. Differences in tissue-specific FGF21 expression and organ responses to the hormone appear to occur under different nutritional or physiological situations. For example, expression of FGF21 is selectively increased in the liver by fasting, by overfeeding in the pancreas, by exercise in muscle, and by cold exposure in brown adipose tissue (BAT). In a similar vein, FGF21 promotes glucose uptake in fat , whereas in liver, it stimulates gluconeogenesis.

Although a unifying view on the physiological value of FGF21 for the survival of mammals may still be lacking, evidence indicates that, under dietary protein restriction, FGF21 plays a homeostatic role leading to extend lifespan and improve metabolic health; proof of concept for this view has been recently provided in experiments with mice. Conforming to this conjecture, long-term low-protein diets increase FGF21 activation in the brain, leading individuals to behaviorally compensate by preferring foods lower in fat and carbohydrates and higher in protein. Again, generally speaking, conditions that require the mobilization of energy stores induce hepatic and BAT-derived FGF21, while conditions that promote energy storage induce WAT and pancreatic FGF21.

FGF family 

The FGF superfamily comprehends nearly two dozen cell signalling proteins involved in a variety of biological processes including embryonic development, cell growth, morphogenesis, tissue repair, tumor growth and invasion. Most of the members of the non-endocrine FGF family typically reside in the extracellular matrix of the relevant tissue, bound to heparinoid moieties, from which FGF molecules are eventually released by tissue remodeling triggers (such as injury) to act as growth factors on target cells located nearby. Contrarily, endocrine FGFs (FGF19, FGF21, FGF23), don't bind heparinoid elements, and are released in soluble form to the extracellular space of their producing cells, often to act on distant target cells.

Production and regulation 

Expression of the FGF21 gene is primarily up regulated by PPAR-α in the liver (typically by fasting), and by PPAR-γ in the adipose tissue. In Hep G2 cells, FGF21 is specifically induced by mitochondrial 3-hydroxy-3-methylglutaryl-CoA synthase 2 (HMGCS2) activity. The oxidized form of ketone bodies (acetoacetate) in the culture medium also induced FGF21, possibly via a sirtuin 1 (SIRT1)-dependent mechanism. HMGCS2 activity has also been shown to be increased by deacetylation of lysines 310, 447, and 473 via SIRT3 in the mitochondria.

While FGF21 is expressed in numerous tissues, including liver, brown adipose tissue, white adipose tissue (WAT) and pancreas (where it favors digestive enzyme secretion), circulating levels of FGF21 are derived specifically from the liver in mice.

Skeletal muscle produces FGF21, its expression being regulated by a PI3-kinase/Akt1 signaling mechanism. FGF21 release from the liver is enhanced during exercise, apparently accompanying increased lipolysis and ketogenesis in fat tissue, together with increased hepatic glycogen degradation and enhanced glucose output from the liver. The involvement of FGF21 in mediating thermogenic responses to cold-exposure has been the object of intense studies. In general terms, production of FGF21 in non-liver tissues is believed to fulfill mostly autocrine or paracrine functions.

At a systemic level, thyroid hormone can regulate adipose and hepatic FGF21 expression and serum levels in mice. Studies in humans revealed a correlation between circulating levels of FGF21 and body mass index (BMI), but contrary to what occurs in rodents, neither fasting nor ketogenic diets have been found to modify such levels, although the latter has been unconfirmed by others. Conversely, the ingestion of fructose has been found to rapidly and sharply increase serum FGF21 levels for up to 4 hours, returning to normal by hour 5. In elderly subjects with T2D resistance training has been reported to significantly lower circulating FGF-21. Also in humans, Liver X receptor (LXR) represses FGF21  via an LXR response element located from -37 to -22 bp on the human FGF21 promoter.

FGF21 receptor 
Similar to those of other endocrine FGFs, FGF21 receptor is a heterodimer, composed of an FGF receptor protein (FGFR) and a (β-) klotho co-receptor. Klotho co-receptors of three types have been described (α, β and γ), all of which are sequentially related to β-glucuronidase, although being devoid of enzymic capacity. FGF21 binds to FGFR through its amino terminus, and to β-klotho though its C-terminus.

FGFRs 
Many molecular species of FGFR have been identified, all arising from the splicing of four primary FGFR genes, to produce proteins of over 800 amino acid residues.  Each FGFR species consists of an extracellular ligand domain composed of three immunoglobulin-like domains, a single transmembrane helix domain, and an intracellular domain having tyrosine kinase activity, which becomes activated upon the functional integration of the FGF21/FGFR/β-Klotho complex. FGF21 can bind to receptor species FGFR1-4.

β-Klotho 
β-Klotho is a single-pass transmembrane protein containing 1043 amino acid residues whose expression is induced in target cells upon their differentiation. β-Klotho interacts closely with FGFR1c or FGFr4 receptor proteins to enhance their binding affinity for FGF21. Loss of β-Klotho at the receptor site renders such receptors unresponsive to FGF21.

Signalling 
In common with all FGF receptors, FGF21R protein embodies a tyrosine kinase capacity, which is activated upon the binding of FGF21, with the simultaneous trigger of receptor dimer generation. Crossed phosphorylation of adjacent receptor dimer chains ensues, which in turns activates their phosphorylating capacities of other intracellular protein substrates, thus sparking a pleiotropic, intracellular signaling cascade. Such cascade signaling may result, for example, in the subsequent activation of the AMPK-SIRT1-PGC-1 alpha pathway for the regulation of glucose, lipid, and energy homeostasis; Other regulatory, intracellular signaling pathways affected by FGF21 in various contexts include cFOS, the Hedgehog pathway, Sirt1-dependent, NF-κB dependent, ATF4 dependent, and BMP2-dependent pathways, among others.

Effects in vitro

Adipocytes 
FGF21 is one of  the most potent insulin sensitizers known. FGF21 stimulates glucose uptake in adipocytes but not in other cell types. This effect is additive to the activity of insulin. FGF21 induces the insulin-sensitizing hormone adiponectin. FGF21 treatment of adipocytes is associated with phosphorylation of FRS2, a protein linking FGF receptors to the Ras/MAP kinase pathway. FGF21 activates mitochondrial oxidative function in adipocytes by activating PGC-1α.

Hepatocytes 
In isolated primary hepatocytes, FGF21 treatment was reported to cause robust responses in the phosphorylation of extracellular signal-regulated kinase (ERK 1/2) and in the expression of PGC-1α nuclear protein.

Effects in vivo

Mice 
FGF21 injection in ob/ob mice results in an increase in Glut1 in adipose tissue. FGF21 also protects mice from diet-induced obesity when over expressed in transgenic mice and lowers blood glucose and triglyceride levels when administered to diabetic rodents. Treatment of mice with FGF21 results in increased energy expenditure, fat utilization and lipid excretion.

FGF21 enhances gluconeogenesis, fatty acid activation and  ketogenesis in the mouse liver under various conditions. FGF21 treatment improves sensitivity to insulin in normal and high-fat fed wild mice. Whether or not in-vivo responses to FGF21 in the liver and other organs are mediated through its prior action on adipocytes is a subject of debate. In the pancreas, FGF21 favors the formation of  pancreatic juice through a β-klotho dependent mechanism.

Whether an overexpression or administration of FGF21 affects female fertility in mice is debated. An early report has shown that an overexpression of FGF21 acts centrally to inhibit the surge in reproductive hormones and therefore cause female infertility. A different study showed no correlation of high FGF21 levels with infertility and demonstrated that estrous cycle can be restored in mice overexpressing FGF21 through a high-fat diet. More recently, a report indicated that a single administration of FGF21 can affect the long term fertility in female mice despite the feeding of a high-fat diet. Further studies are needed to study the effect of FGF21 on female fertility.

Other animals 
In late-pregnant cows, FGF21 plasma levels change from undetectable to high upon parturition and the beginning of lactation, apparently reflecting a change to an energy insufficient state during early lactation, where the liver was the major source of FGF21.

Non-human primates 
Administration of FGF21 or its analogs to obese non-human primates has been shown to decrease food intake, reduce overweight and improve plasma lipid profile while increasing circulating adiponectin.

Clinical significance 
Serum FGF21 levels are significantly increased in obesity and in patients with type 2 diabetes mellitus (T2DM), presumably indicating a state of FGF21-resistance.

Elevated levels also correlate with liver fat content in non-alcoholic fatty liver disease and positively correlate with Body Mass Index in humans, again suggesting obesity as a FGF21-resistant state, although this postulate is still a subject of debate. Both high sugar and low protein diets can elevate FGF21 in animals and humans. Also, reports awaiting confirmation would indicate that circulating FGF21 levels may have prognostic value for the early detection of injury in patients with liver transplantation.

FGF21 can inhibit mTORC1 in the liver and stimulate adiponectin secretion from fatty tissues, thereby inhibiting aging-associated metabolic syndrome. FGF21 protects against diabetic cardiomyopathy primarily by PGC-1α-induction of beta oxidation. The anti-inflammatory effects of FGF21 may primarily be due to inhibition of NF-κB in macrophages. In mice, FGF21 has been shown to protect against high fat diet-induced inflammation and islet hyperplasia in the pancreas, a finding of possible clinical relevance.

A single-nucleotide polymorphism (SNP) of the FGF21 gene – the FGF21 rs838133 variant (frequency 44.7%) – has been identified as a genetic mechanism responsible for the sweet tooth behavioral phenotype, a trait associated with cravings for sweets and high sugar consumption, in both humans and mice.

From a pharmacological perspective, FGF21 analogs can effectively reduce hyperglycemia in diabetic rodents, but not in clinical disease. In obese individuals however (mice, monkeys or human), systemically given FGF21 can increase energy expenditure, trigger body weight reduction, and reduce abnormally high circulating insulin, triglycerides, and LDL-cholesterol levels. In obese mice, FGF21 treatment can also reduce circulating glucose and abnormal fat accumulation in the liver. Given these properties, FGF21 and its analogs may prove particularly effective in the treatment of metabolic syndrome.

Also, FGF21 administration has been shown to cause the reduction of sugar and alcohol intake, and to have anti-toxic or anti-inflammatory effects in the liver and pancreas. FGF21 appears capable of crossing the blood-brain barrier, and in fact, some of the effects of FGF21 administration on metabolic variables and on food preferences may be mediated through its action in brain pathways.

Preclinical studies 
Mice lacking FGF21 fail to fully induce PGC-1α expression in response to a prolonged fast and have impaired gluconeogenesis and ketogenesis.

FGF21 stimulates phosphorylation of fibroblast growth factor receptor substrate 2 and ERK1/2 in the liver. Acute FGF21 treatment induced hepatic expression of key regulators of gluconeogenesis, lipid metabolism, and ketogenesis including glucose-6-phosphatase, phosphoenol pyruvate carboxykinase, 3-hydroxybutyrate dehydrogenase type 1, and carnitine palmitoyltransferase 1α. In addition, injection of FGF21 was associated with decreased circulating insulin and free fatty acid levels. FGF21 treatment induced mRNA and protein expression of PGC-1α, but in mice PGC-1α expression was not necessary for the effect of FGF21 on glucose metabolism.

In mice FGF21 is strongly induced in liver by prolonged fasting via PPAR-alpha and in turn induces the transcriptional coactivator PGC-1α and stimulates hepatic gluconeogenesis, fatty acid oxidation, and ketogenesis. In mice, FGF21 may be necessary for them to display the hibernation-like state of torpor, also for eliciting and coordinating the adaptive response to fasting and starvation. FGF21 expression is also induced in white adipose tissue by PPAR-gamma, which may indicate it also regulates metabolism in the fed state. FGF21 is induced in both rodents and humans consuming a low protein diet. FGF21 expression is also induced by diets with reduced levels of the essential dietary amino acids methionine, isoleucine, or threonine, or with reduced levels of branched-chain amino acids. Interestingly, methionine restriction can increase circulating FGF21 between 5-fold and 10-fold in mice, while simultaneously boosting energy expenditure, insulin sensitivity and mobilization of fat stores, the latter effects requiring intact FGF21 signaling in the brain.

In mice with acute ablation of thermogenic adipose tissues, FGF21-induced weight loss appears to be at least partially mediated by increased physical activity as well as by a centrally mediated increase in energy expenditure.

In rats, steatosis induced by cafeteria diet was accompanied by high serum FGF21, whereas oral taurine supplementation prevented both steatosis and high FGF21 levels.

Fructose ingestion also induced FGF21 in humans, where it causes a rise in FGF21 levels in serum; likewise in mice, where serum FGF21 increases and induction of FGF21 in the liver can be confirmed. A dramatic increase in circulating FGF21 in humans is induced by the consumption of alcohol. Acutely, the rise in FGF21 in response to alcohol consumption inhibits further drinking. Chronically, the rise in FGF21 expression in the liver may protect against liver damage.

Activation of AMPK and SIRT1 by FGF21 in adipocytes enhanced mitochondrial oxidative capacity as demonstrated by increases in oxygen consumption, citrate synthase activity, and induction of key metabolic genes. The effects of FGF21 on mitochondrial function require serine/threonine kinase 11 (STK11/LKB1), which activates AMPK. Inhibition of AMPK, SIRT1, and PGC-1α activities attenuated the effects of FGF21 on oxygen consumption and gene expression, indicating that FGF21 regulates mitochondrial activity and enhances oxidative capacity through an LKB1-AMPK-SIRT1-PGC-1α-dependent mechanism in adipocytes, resulting in increased phosphorylation of AMPK, increased cellular NAD+ levels and activation of SIRT1 and deacetylation of SIRT1 targets PGC-1α and histone 3.

FGF21 mimetics 
Three types of compounds to enhance FGF21 have been proposed or developed: 1. modified FGF21 proteins, 2. antibodies to the FGF21 receptor complex, and 3. inhibitors of FGF21 degradation by protease. The list of modified FGF21 proteins that have been developed include LY2405319, LY3025876, LY3084077, BMS986036, BMS986171, PF05231023 and AMG876. Antibody-based FGF21R agonists include BFKB8488A and NGM313. A number of antibodies to the FGF21R complex have been developed and tested  to some extent as FGF21 mimetics by Genentech (bFKB1), and Amgen (mimAb1). Although FGF21 mimetics  were initially considered an option to treat T2D, the bulk of evidence prompted a change of expectations towards more realistic views for their possible clinical use in the normalization of  lipid metabolism in dislipidemic obese patients, and to prevent and treat non-alcoholic steatohepatitis (NASH).

FGF21 antagonists 
At least two peptide compounds showing antagonist properties of FGF21 action have been described, their eventual clinical utility being uncertain.

Clinical trials

LY2405319 (Lilly) 
In a randomized, placebo-controlled, double-blind proof-of-concept trial, 4 weeks of daily subcutaneous treatment of obese diabetic patients with LY2405319 significantly lowered plasma triglycerides and low-density lipoprotein cholesterol (LDLc), and increased high-density lipoprotein cholesterol (HDLc).

LLF580 (Novartis) 
In obese, mildly hypertriglyceridemic adults, LLF580 lowered serum triglycerides by 54%, lowered serum triglycerides by 54%, reduced liver fat by 52% over placebo. Treatment with LLF580 had beneficial effects on serum lipids, liver fat, and biomarkers of liver injury; with mild to moderate gastrointestinal adverse effects.

AKR-001 (Akero) 
In T2D patients, AKR-001 treatment produced favorable effects in lipoprotein profile, including triglycerides, non-high-density lipoprotein (non-HDL) cholesterol, HDL-C, and apolipoproteins B and C3.

BMS-986036 (Bristol-Myers Squibb) 
Subcutaneous treatment of obese, diabetic patients with BMS-986036 (Pegbelfermin, a recombinant PEGylated FGF21 analog), improved serum lipid profile and adiponectin levels, with no effect on HbA1c.

PF-05231023 (Pfizer) 
xSubcutaneous treatment of obese, diabetic patients with BMS-986036 (Pegbelfermin, a recombinant PEGylated FGF21 analog), improved serum lipid profile and adiponectin levels, with no effect on HbA1c.

References

Further reading

External links 
 
 
 
Got a sweet tooth? Blame your liver Phys.org, 2017

Aging-related proteins
Anti-aging substances